Challenger Early College High School is a public secondary school in Hickory, North Carolina, United States on the campus of Catawba Valley Community College. Challenger Early College High School is ranked the top high school in Catawba County Schools.

History
Challenger Early College High School was established in August 2005 as a joint project of the Catawba Valley Education Consortium, including Catawba County Schools, Alexander County Schools, Hickory City Schools, Newton-Conover City Schools, and Catawba Valley Community College.

Applying to Challenger
At the end of 8th grade, about 300 students from Catawba County apply to Challenger Early College High School.  From the pool of students that apply, one-hundred students are accepted with consideration to level of education attained by their parents, family socio-economic status, ethnicity population at national and state universities, single-parent home status, teacher recommendations for success in an accelerated program.

Learning programs
In an effort to fulfill the vision of Challenger Early College High School, multiple programs are incarnated into the learning environment to ensure that students are prepared for college, careers, and life in the 21st century.

Habits of Mind
As of August 2012, Challenger Early College High School adopted the Habits of Mind Program. The Habits of Mind include sixteen habits that students are expected to regularly be working on.

NCNSP Common Instructional Framework
Challenger Early College High School follows the NCNSP Common Instructional Framework, which uses skills such as collaborative group work, classroom talk, scaffolding, questioning, literacy groups, and the process of writing to learn.

Extracurricular activities

Performing arts
Challenger Early College High School offers multiple performing arts programs.  
 Concert Band 
 Chorus 
 Honors Chorus
 Drama Club

Sports
Multiple sports are carried out at Challenger Early College High School throughout the school year.

Fall sports
 Men's Varsity Soccer  
 Varsity Volley Ball 
 Jr. Varsity Volley Ball

Winter sports
 Varsity Men's Basketball
 Varsity Women's Basketball
 Varsity Cheerleading

Spring sports
  Varsity Baseball
  Varsity Softball
  Women's Varsity Soccer

Clubs
 Drama Club
 Debate Club
 Anime Club
 STEM Club
 Interact Club
 Beta Club
 TV Production 
 Yearbook Committee 
 Student Government Association 
 Journalism Club
 Chess Club
 Fellowship of Christian Students
 Art Club
 True Crime Club
 Korean Club
 SkillsUSA

Graduation requirements
Besides the normal class requirements, Challenger Early College High School students are also expected to do fifty hours of community service.  They are also expected to present an ePortfolio that showcases their high-school learning career and the skills they developed to a panel of community evaluators.  As a parent-involvement program, parents are required to attend at least five meetings and volunteer four hours every year.

References
 

Schools in Catawba County, North Carolina
Public high schools in North Carolina